Gert Jan Lebbink (born November 21, 1961 in Deventer) is a Dutch sprint canoer who competed in the early to mid-1980s. He won a silver in the K-2 10000 m event at the 1982 ICF Canoe Sprint World Championships in Belgrade.

Lebbnik also competed in two Summer Olympics, earning his best finish of seventh in the K-2 1000 m event at Moscow in 1980.

References

1961 births
Living people
Canoeists at the 1980 Summer Olympics
Canoeists at the 1984 Summer Olympics
Dutch male canoeists
Olympic canoeists of the Netherlands
Sportspeople from Deventer
ICF Canoe Sprint World Championships medalists in kayak
20th-century Dutch people
21st-century Dutch people